"Worn Down Piano" is a song by the American group The Mark & Clark Band, from their album Double Take.
The song was written in 1977 by twin brothers Clark and Mark Seymour. The record was produced by Ron Dante of Archies fame, and was released as a single.

The song (duration 8:10) is about a piano that is being bid for at an auction. It starts in 6/8 time and changes to 4/4 time at the beginning of the piano solo.

The song reached sixth place in the Dutch Top 40. Since 2000, "Worn Down Piano" has consistently been in the Top 2000, a popular Dutch year-end list, peaking at number 59 in the 2002 edition.

Credits
These musicians appear on the recording:
Clark Seymour, piano, vocals
Mark Seymour, piano, vocals
Allan Schwartzberg, drums
Errol "Crusher" Bennett, percussion
Elliott Randall, guitar
Frank Owens, keyboards
Hugh McCracken, guitar
Jimmy Maelen, percussion
Jimmy Young, drums
John Tropea, guitar
Kenneth Bichel, synthesizer
Paul Shaffer, keyboards
Will Lee, bass

References

Songs about pianos
Songs about old age
1977 singles
1977 songs